The All-Ireland Under-21 Hurling Championship 2013 was the 50th staging of the All-Ireland championship since its establishment in 1964. The draw for the 2013 fixtures took place in October 2012. The championship began 31 May 2013 and ended on 14 September 2013.

Clare were the defending champions and retained their title after defeating Antrim 2-28 to 012 in the final.

Fixtures

Leinster Under-21 Hurling Championship

Munster Under-21 Hurling Championship

Ulster Under-21 Hurling Championship

All-Ireland Under-21 Hurling Championship

Championship statistics

Miscellaneous

 Wexford won the Leinster title for the first time since 2002.
 Clare retained the Munster crown for the first time in their history.
 After losing thirty-two All-Ireland semi-finals, Antrim finally triumphed and qualified for their first ever All-Ireland decider. The final saw the second ever meeting between Antrim and Clare. Clare won the game and retained the All-Ireland title for the first time in their history.

Top scorers

Championship

Single game

References

External links
 2013 Bord Gais Energy Munster GAA Hurling U21 Championship

Under-21
All-Ireland Under-21 Hurling Championship